Robert Kasande, is a geologist and civil servant, in Uganda, who serves as the Permanent Secretary in the Uganda Ministry of Justice and Constitutional Affairs, since July 2021. 

Before that, he was the Permanent Secretary in the Ministry of Energy and Mineral Development in Uganda, from August 2017 until July 2021. Immediately before that, he was the Director of the Petroleum Directorate, in the same ministry.

Background and education
Kasande is a trained professional geologist.

Career
Robert Kasande has served as a technocrat in the Ministry of Energy and Mineral Development in the past. Besides his duties as the director of the Petroleum Directorate in the Ministry, he also was the project manager for the oil refinery project. He is part of the team of Ugandan technocrats, examining ways on how Uganda and neighboring Tanzania can collaborate on exploring for oil in Tanzania and management of oil pipelines in Uganda.

See also
Energy in Uganda
List of power stations in Uganda
Irene Muloni
Stephen Isabalija

References

External links
Website of the Uganda Ministry of Energy and Mineral Development
Uganda Shortlists Four Firms for Oil Refinery Project on 1 May 2017.

Living people
Year of birth missing (living people)
Makerere University alumni
Ugandan Christians